Orange II is a large catamaran designed for ocean racing, a "maxicat". The boat is 36.80 m long and has a 45 m mast and was designed by the Gilles Ollier Multiplast design team and built by the Multiplast yard in Vannes, France.

History 
Orange II held the Jules Verne Trophy for the fastest time around-the-world at 50 days, 16 hours, 20 minutes and 4 seconds from 2005 until March 2010. Orange II was skippered by Frenchman Bruno Peyron.

The sponsor, Orange (formerly France Télécom), discontinued its yacht racing activities. The boat was in storage at Multiplast for several years.

In February 2014, the boat was purchased by François Bich.

The yacht was restored and given the name VITALIA II. The first tests of the new craft took place in April 2015.

See also
List of large sailing yachts

References

External links
BYM News Photo Gallery Album with hundreds of Orange II photos.
BYM News Interview with Orange II skipper Bruno Peyron.
BYM News Interview with Orange II designer Giles Ollier.

Individual catamarans
Individual sailing vessels
2000s sailing yachts
Sailing yachts designed by Gilles Ollier
Sailing yachts built in France